The 2000–01 Bangladeshi cricket season marked the beginning of first-class domestic competition in Bangladesh, although the country had already staged first-class matches against touring teams in the previous year.  The Green Delta National Cricket League was constituted as the first-class championship.

International tours

Indian cricket team in Bangladesh
India's national team visited Bangladesh in 2000–01 to take part in the inaugural Test match played by the Bangladesh national cricket team. The tour consisted of a one off test match.

Bangladeshi cricket team in Zimbabwe

The Bangladesh national team also toured Zimbabwe and played 2 Test matches and 3 One Day Internationals in April 2001. Bangladesh lost all 5 matches.

Domestic competitions

Honours
The National Cricket League champions were Biman Bangladesh Airlines. The most first-class runs were scored by Imran Farhat (Biman) with 735 and the most wickets taken being 57 by Enamul Haque (Chittagong).

National Cricket League
Although separate first-class and limited overs matches were contested by domestic teams in the 2000-01 season, results from both formats were combined to form a common points table. In the first round teams were placed in two groups of four. Each team played a 3-day first-class match and a 50 overs limited overs match against the other teams in its group, home and away. The top two teams from each group progressed to the final round where teams played a 4-day first-class and a 50 overs limited match against the qualifiers from the other group, home and away.

Group A

Group B

Final stage

Other matches

See also
 History of cricket in Bangladesh

References

Further reading
 Wisden Cricketers' Almanack 2002

2000 in Bangladeshi cricket
2001 in Bangladeshi cricket
Bangladeshi cricket seasons from 2000–01
Bangladeshi cricket season